Woody breast is an abnormal muscle condition that impacts the texture and usability of chicken breast meat. The specific cause is not known but may be related to factors associated with rapid growth rates. Although distasteful to many, meat that exhibits woody breast is not known to be harmful to humans who consume it. When detected by suppliers, product shown to have the condition present may be discounted or processed as ground chicken. Woody breast has become so prevalent in the broiler industry that the U.S. Poultry & Egg Association has helped fund four research projects with over $250,000 in an effort to understand and address the condition. Estimates placed the total cost to the global industry as high as US$1 billion in 2020 for losses associated with managing the woody breast condition in broiler chickens.

References

General references 
 
 
 
 
 

Chicken as food
Poultry farming